The Invasion from Within! is the first EP released by Tsunami Bomb, and their third release overall.

History
The Invasion from Within! would be the band's only release on Tomato Head Records but is the label's best selling album. After this release, the band signed to the larger independent label, Kung Fu Records. The title track was used in Atlus USA's release of the Strategy RPG Disgaea: Hour of Darkness. The song is noticeably absent in the Japanese audio track. Because only Atlus owned the rights to the song, it is not present in ports of the game such as Disgaea: Afternoon of Darkness and Disgaea 1 Complete, which were not published by Atlus.

Track listing
 "The Invasion from Within" – 2:25
 "No One's Looking" – 2:42
 "No Good Very Bad Day" – 1:46
 "Marionette" – 3:05
 "Lemonade" – 2:25
 "...Not Forever" – 3:00

Tsunami Bomb albums
2000 EPs